Gordon Alfred Tidman,  (born August 21, 1932) is a Canadian lawyer, politician and judge. He represented the electoral district of Kings West in the Nova Scotia House of Assembly from 1967 to 1971. He was a member of the Nova Scotia Progressive Conservative Party.

Tidman was born in Country Harbour, Nova Scotia. He attended King's-Edgehill School,  University of King's College and Dalhousie University, earning a Bachelor of Laws degree. In 1957, he married Margaret Sprague. He served in the Executive Council of Nova Scotia as Minister of Public Welfare from 1969 to 1970. He was named a Queen's Counsel in 1974. Tidman was appointed a judge of the Nova Scotia Supreme Court in 1985. He retired from the court in 2007.

References

Living people
1932 births
Progressive Conservative Association of Nova Scotia MLAs
Members of the Executive Council of Nova Scotia
University of King's College alumni
Dalhousie University alumni
Canadian King's Counsel